Neocollyris werneri is a species of ground beetle in the genus Neocollyris in the family Carabidae. It was described by Naviaux in 1991.You can watch its family Carabidae here.

References

Werneri, Neocollyris
Beetles described in 1991